St. Peter's Roman Catholic Church is a historic church building in Echo, Oregon, United States. The church was built by the Portuguese immigrant community in Echo.

The church was added to the National Register of Historic Places in 1997.

See also
National Register of Historic Places listings in Umatilla County, Oregon

References

External links

Former Roman Catholic church buildings in Oregon
Roman Catholic Diocese of Baker
Churches on the National Register of Historic Places in Oregon
Mission Revival architecture in Oregon
Roman Catholic churches completed in 1913
Buildings and structures in Umatilla County, Oregon
National Register of Historic Places in Umatilla County, Oregon
1913 establishments in Oregon
Echo, Oregon
Portuguese-American history
20th-century Roman Catholic church buildings in the United States